Paul Marney (born 28 April 1982) is an English association footballer currently unattached.

Marney first came to prominence during the 2001–02 season when his allegedly 'improper' registration for St Patrick's Athletic  resulted in the League deducting the club nine points. St Pat's took the League to arbitration and won their case (Marney had already been playing for the club for some time).

Marney made 29 appearances and scored one goal during that league campaign for the Saints, and though League winners' medals were awarded to both Shelbourne and St Pat's (due to further alleged irregularities), the Saints maintain that they are the sole and rightful League Champions for that season, but they weren't and the following season played in the Intertoto Cup. The League's system for registering players was subsequently changed. He made 16 appearances the following season but after falling out of favour, Marney was plucked from there before the closure of the final 2003 season transfer window when Trevor Anderson signed him for Dundalk.

Paul scored his first goal for Dundalk against Galway United F.C. in 2004. Marney also had previous spells with West Ham United F.C. and Sutton United F.C.

Marney won a League of Ireland First Division winners medal after the 2008 season with Dundalk but he departed the Lilywhites after that season and has since has moved back to England.

He is rumoured to have taken up Kick-boxing and has had several wins in the sport.

Honours
League of Ireland First Division: 1
 Dundalk - 2008

References

Living people
1982 births
League of Ireland players
St Patrick's Athletic F.C. players
Dundalk F.C. players
English footballers
Association football midfielders
West Ham United F.C. players
Sutton United F.C. players